Šakvice is a municipality and village in Břeclav District in the South Moravian Region of the Czech Republic. It has about 1,500 inhabitants.

History
The first written mention of Šakvice is from 1248.

Šakvice train collision took place here in 1953.

References

Villages in Břeclav District